Bereket District (formerly Gazanjyk District) is a district of Balkan Region in Turkmenistan. The administrative center of the district is the city of Bereket.

History 
Founded in January 1925 as a district of Kazandjik Kazandzhiksky Poltoratsky District Turkmen SSR centered on Cazangic station. 
In August 1926 was abolished Poltoratsky County and Kazandzhiksky District passed under the direct supervision of the Turkmen SSR. 
In November 1939 Kazandzhiksky District went to the newly formed Krasnovodsk Oblast.
In January 1947 Krasnovodsk Oblast was abolished and the area was transferred to the Ashgabat Oblast. 
In April 1952 Krasnovodsk Oblast has been restored and re-entered the Kazandzhiksky District in its composition. 
In December 1955 Krasnovodsk Oblast was again abolished and the area again became a part of the Ashkhabad Oblast. 
In May 1959, Ashgabat Oblast was abolished and the region was under the direct supervision of the Turkmen SSR. 
In December 1973 the district was transferred to rebuilt Krasnovodsk Oblast. 
In 1988 Krasnovodsk Oblast again was abolished and the region was under the direct supervision of the Turkmen SSR. 
In 1991 Kazandzhiksky District became part of the Balkan Region was renamed in Gazandzhyksky Etrap first, and then in Bereket district.

Populated places in Bereket District 
Akjadepe - railway station, pop. 23.
Akjaguýma, Turkmenistan - railway station, pop. 120. 
Däneata - railway station, pop. 100.
Dövletýar - railway station, pop. 40. 
Bugdaýly - railway station, pop. 33.
Balguýi - railway station, pop. 30.
Ejeri - mineral springs, pop. 2–3.
Iskender, Turkmenistan - railway station, pop. 255.
Madaw - railway station, pop. 152.
Oboý - railway station, pop. 725.
Uzyn-suw - railway station, pop. 350.
Arkaç - railway station, pop. 35.
Aýdyn - railway station, pop. 35.
Bala-Işem - railway station, pop. 730.

References

Districts of Turkmenistan
Balkan Region